Osmaniye Mosque, also locally called Frangomachala Mosque (Τζαμί του Φραγκομαχαλά, "Mosque of the Frankish Quarter") is one of the three remaining mosques on the island of Chios, Greece, located inside the old citadel area of Chios town, which was the main neighborhood of the Turkish community of the island.

History 
The mosque's construction started in 1891 on the orders of Sultan Abdülhamit II, when Chios city was serving as the capital of the Vilayet of the Archipelago. The construction was completed in 1892. The marble inscription (kitâbe) over the door of the mosque mentions this information. It was prepared by the Turkish artist Feyzî.

Recent 
The mosque was officially registered by Greek Ministry of Culture as a cultural landmark on January 21, 1983.

As a result, in 1997, the mosque was repaired and renovated by the Greek government and made available for hosting exhibitions and various cultural events.

Architecture 
The mosque has a rectangular plan with a 8x10 m area and a 8x8 m main praying hall. It has a roof-floor, an inlet port and also a gallery on the west side which serves to access the minaret. The minaret has an octagonal shape and is located on the northeastern corner of the mosque. In addition, there is a historical Turkish building connected to the minaret and is an outbuilding to the mosque which contained service rooms during Turkish rule.

The Osmanie Mosque was built in same period with another Turkish mosque which still survives, Hamidiye Mosque, in Chios and shows similarities in architectural style.

References 

Ottoman mosques in Greece
Buildings and structures in Chios
Ottoman Chios
Mosques completed in 1892
19th-century architecture in Greece
Former mosques in Greece